The Taipei Metro Qiyan station (formerly transliterated as Chiyen Station until 2003) is located in the Beitou District of Taipei City, Taiwan. It is a station on the Tamsui Line (Red Line).

Station overview

The two-level, elevated station structure with one island platform and one exit. The station is situated between east of Beitou Road, and the beginning of Sanhe Road. The washrooms are inside the entrance area. 
On trains to Beitou, an announcement is made recommending passengers for stations north of Beitou to change trains at this station since Beitou does not offer same platform transfer between trains terminating at Beitou and trains continuing to Tamsui.

The station name is a historic name of the area that literally means "interesting rock", referring to Junjianyan, a sandstone formation to the east.

Station layout

References

1997 establishments in Taiwan
Tamsui–Xinyi line stations
Railway stations opened in 1997